National selections refer to the processes in which the broadcasters of the countries participating in the annual Eurovision Song Contest select the artist and song that will represent them in the contest.

The two principal ways for broadcasters to select their entries are open selections (national finals) and closed selections (internal selections). Since the introduction of semi-finals in the  – due to the extensive amount of participating countries – and the rule of the "Big Five" countries (and the ), a wide range of countries have often alternated between national finals and internal selections based on final placing at the contest.

National finals 

National finals are the process in which the public of a country can choose the artist with their song, often combining public televoting with the vote of an expert jury.

Organised by the broadcaster, these national finals (consisting of one or more shows) can be televised or non-televised, however, most of the time they are televised as prime-time television shows. On several occasions, the artist is selected internally and the public of the country chooses a song for them through a national final. Alternatively, the broadcaster can select a song and make the public choose the artist that will perform the song through a national final.

In 2012, over an estimated four million people in Sweden watched the final, almost half of the Swedish population.

In 2020, this format was abandoned in favour of a return to the open format seen between 2012 and 2017.

Internal selections 

Internal selections are the process in which the broadcaster of a country appoints a committee or expert panel to select either the artist and the song, sometimes both, without holding a public vote.

Choosing this method is also a common strategy for countries after having failed to qualify for the final on several occasions.

Participants 

 52 countries have participated in the contest at least once, and a record 43 countries participated in 2008, 2011 and 2018.

Notes and references

Notes

References

External links